Several ships of the Swedish Navy have been named HSwMS Visby, named after the city of Visby:

  was a  launched in 1942 and decommissioned in 1982
  is a  launched in 2000

Swedish Navy ship names